Mikhail Yurchenko (born 20 June 1970) is a retired boxer from Kazakhstan, who competed for his native country in the Men's Super Heavyweight (+ 91 kg) division at the 1996 Summer Olympics in Atlanta, Georgia. There he was defeated in the second round by Russia's eventual bronze medalist Alexei Lezin.

External links
 
sports-reference

1970 births
Living people
Heavyweight boxers
Boxers at the 1996 Summer Olympics
Olympic boxers of Kazakhstan
Kazakhstani male boxers
Kazakhstani people of Russian descent